The Serra Spanish mackerel (Scomberomorus brasiliensis) is a species of fish in the family Scombridae. Specimens have been recorded at up to 125 cm in length, and weighing up to 6.71 kg. It is found in the western Atlantic, along the Caribbean and Atlantic coasts of Central and South America from Belize to Rio Grande do Sul, Brazil. Literature records for S. maculatus (Atlantic Spanish mackerel) from the area apply to S. brasiliensis, which has erroneously been considered a synonym of S. maculatus by many authors. It feeds on small fish, squid/cuttlefish, shrimp/prawn, and isopods.

References

 
 
 Collette, Russo, Zavala-Camin  (1978). Scomberomorus brasiliensis, A new species of Spanish Mackerel from the western Atlantic. United States National Marine Fisheries Service Fishery Bulletin 76(1): 273-280|https://archive.org/details/fisherybulletin76unit/page/272/mode/2up.

Scombridae
Taxa named by Bruce Baden Collette
Taxa named by Joseph L. Russo
Taxa named by Luis Alberto Zavala-Camin
Fish described in 1978
Scomberomorus